Reto Burri (born 3 March 1976) is a retired Swiss football striker.

References

1976 births
Living people
Swiss men's footballers
SC Kriens players
FC Luzern players
FC Aarau players
FC Sion players
BSC Young Boys players
FC Zürich players
Association football forwards